Folsomville is an unincorporated community in Owen Township, Warrick County, in the U.S. state of Indiana.

History
Folsomville was laid out in 1859 by Benjamin Folsom, and named for him. A post office has been in operation at Folsomville since 1863. Folsomville used to have the nickname "Lick Skillet."

Geography

References

Unincorporated communities in Warrick County, Indiana
Unincorporated communities in Indiana